Liang Jun may refer to:
Liang Jun (fencer) (born 1969), Chinese fencer
Liang Jun (tractor driver) (1930–2020), Chinese folk hero and model worker
Liang Xinjun (born 1968), Chinese entrepreneur